"Bury Me Not on the Lone Prairie" is a cowboy folk song. Also known as "The Cowboy's Lament", "The Dying Cowboy", "Bury Me Out on the Lone Prairie", and "Oh, Bury Me Not", the song is described as the most famous cowboy ballad. Members of the Western Writers of America chose it as one of the Top 100 Western songs of all time. Based on a sailor's song, the song has been recorded by many artists, including Moe Bandy, Johnny Cash, Cisco Houston, Burl Ives, Bruce Molsky, The Residents, Tex Ritter, Roy Rogers, Colter Wall and William Elliott Whitmore.

History

Earlier version
The ballad is an adaptation of a sea song called "The Sailor's Grave" or "The Ocean Burial", which began "O bury me not in the deep, deep sea." The Ocean Burial was written by Edwin Hubbell Chapin, published in 1839, and put to music by George N. Allen.

First times in print
The earliest written version of the song was published in John Lomax's "Cowboy Songs and Other Frontier Ballads" in 1910. It would first be recorded by Carl T. Sprague in 1926, and was released on a 10" single through Victor Records. The following year, the melody and lyrics were collected and published in Carl Sandburg's American Songbag.

An article published in the Uvalde, Texas, Uvalde Leader-News in 1928 suggests that the origin of the song was the small town of Lohn, Texas. The article states that the song was originally about the Lohn Prairie, and was later changed to "Lone Prairie."

Originally collected with different music than that widely known today, Bury Me Not On the Lone Prairie first appeared in print with the present melody in 1932, with a likely origin of North Carolina, though the speaker at that time requested—contrary to other renditions—to "bury me out on the lone prairie."

Other versions 
The song has been released on albums by Moe Bandy, Johnny Cash, Burl Ives, Bruce Molsky, Tex Ritter, and Roy Rogers, among others. Even avant-garde musicians, The Residents, have covered the song for their Cube-E (1988–90) and Talking Light (2010–11) tours. 

Under the alternate title "Bury Me Out on the Lone Prairie", it has been recorded by Johnnie Ray.

In popular culture 
The Bury Me Not On The Lone Prairie music was adapted for the soundtrack to John Ford's 1939 western film Stagecoach. Its theme is repeatedly heard throughout the movie.

In the final episode of The Munsters, Lily Munster plays the organ while she, her husband, and her father sing "Bury Me Not on the Lone Prairie," after which she says "It's nice to get together and sing those old, fun songs."

Bugs Bunny sings the line "bury me not on the lone prairie" in at least four Warner Brothers animated shorts: 1942's The Wacky Wabbit (while shoveling dirt into a hole Elmer Fudd has just fallen into); 1945's Hare Trigger (after Yosemite Sam, mistaking red ink Bugs has poured on him for blood, falls down as if dead); 1980's Portrait of the Artist as a Young Bunny (while pretending to die); and 1992's Invasion of the Bunny Snatchers (on arriving at a desert).

A version of this song was used in the popular video game Red Dead Redemption, sung by William Elliott Whitmore.

Premise
The song records the plaintive request of a dying man not to be buried on the prairie, away from civilization. In spite of his request, he is buried on the prairie. As with many folk songs, there are a number of variations of that basic theme.

Lyrics
This version of the lyrics date back to the early 19th century.
"O bury me not on the lone prairie."
These words came low and mournfully
From the pallid lips of the youth who lay
On his dying bed at the close of day.

He had wasted and pined 'til o'er his brow
Death's shades were slowly gathering now
He thought of home and loved ones nigh,
As the cowboys gathered to see him die.

"O bury me not on the lone prairie
Where coyotes howl and the wind blows free
In a narrow grave just six by three—
O bury me not on the lone prairie"

"It matters not, I've been told,
Where the body lies when the heart grows cold
Yet grant, o grant, this wish to me
O bury me not on the lone prairie."

"I've always wished to be laid when I died
In a little churchyard on the green hillside
By my father's grave, there let me be,
O bury me not on the lone prairie."

"I wish to lie where a mother's prayer
And a sister's tear will mingle there.
Where friends can come and weep o'er me.
O bury me not on the lone prairie."

"For there's another whose tears will shed.
For the one who lies in a prairie bed.
It breaks me heart to think of her now,
She has curled these locks, she has kissed this brow."

"O bury me not..." And his voice failed there.
But they took no heed to his dying prayer.
In a narrow grave, just six by three
They buried him there on the lone prairie.

And the cowboys now as they roam the plain,
For they marked the spot where his bones were lain,
Fling a handful o' roses o'er his grave
With a prayer to God his soul to save.

Alternative versions
One version collected for publication by the Southern Pacific Company in 1912 omits the final verse and concludes with another round of the chorus, which is there rendered:
"O bury me not on the lone prairie
Where the wild coyote will howl o'er me
Where the rattlesnakes hiss and the wind blows free
O bury me not on the lone prairie.
Another specifies that the speaker is "a trapper...at the point of death /...short his bank account, short his breath".

Recordings

Vernon Dalhart, 1922
The Residents performed it as part of their Cube-E performances, and a recording is included on Cube E: Live in Holland (1994)
Charlie Zahm recorded it on his 2003 album Songs for When the Sun Goes Down.
William Elliott Whitmore recorded it for the game Red Dead Redemption.
Bruce Molsky plays and sings the tune on his album Soon Be Time (2006).
Kathy Johnson sings it in her album Way Out West (2000).
Cameron Knowler recorded it on his 2019 album Honey off a Rock.

References

Western music (North America)
Songs about death
1926 singles
Songs about cowboys and cowgirls
Songs about the United States
American Songbag songs
Folk ballads